The German Thaya or Austrian Thaya is a river in Lower Austria.

Despite its name, no part of the river is in Germany. First, it flows in north-easterly direction to the village of Vitis, where it is joined by the left tributary Jaudlingbach. It flows further eastward to Schwarzenau and gradually turns to the north, zig-zagging through Waidhofen, Thaya, and Dobersberg. Then it turns to the east and southeast, flowing through Karlstein and Raabs, where it joins the Moravian Thaya.

From here the unified Thaya flows generally eastward into the Czech Republic.

Eduard Mörike's 1856 novella  mentions the German Thaya, claiming that Mozart and his wife crossed it on September 14, 1787 (see Mozart in fiction).

References

External links

Hydrological data 

Rivers of Lower Austria
Rivers of Austria